The following is a list of squads for each national team competing at the Euro 2012 in Poland and Ukraine. The tournament started on June 8, 2012 and the final took place in Kyiv on July 1, 2012.

Each national team had to submit a squad of 23 players by May 29, 2012, three of whom must be goalkeepers. If a player was injured severely enough to prevent his participation in the tournament before his team's first match, he could be replaced by another player.

Club memberships are correct as of the 2011–12 season. Caps and goals correct as of June 18, 2012. Ages are correct as of June 8, 2012, the opening day of the tournament.

Group A

Poland
Manager: Franciszek Smuda

On 2 May 2012, Smuda named a provisional list of 23 players for the tournament, along with a seven-man reserve list. Łukasz Fabiański withdrew from the squad on 26 May 2012 with a shoulder injury and was replaced by Grzegorz Sandomierski from the reserve list; Smuda named his 23-man final squad the following day.

Greece
Manager:  Fernando Santos

Santos named his first shortlist, composed of players based abroad, on 10 May 2012, and the second, composed of Greece-based players on 17 May 2012, totalling a 25-player provisional list. On 28 May 2012, Santos announced his 23-man squad.

Russia
Manager:  Dick Advocaat

On 11 May 2012, Advocaat named a provisional list of 26 players for the tournament. Vasili Berezutski and Roman Shishkin withdrew on 20 and 24 May respectively, Berezutski with a thigh injury and Shishkin due to a stomach complaint. Advocaat named his final squad on 25 May 2012; Kirill Nababkin was named having not been included in the provisional party.

A 2012 friendly match against Lithuania, recognized by the Russian Football Union but not by FIFA, is not counted for caps.

Czech Republic
Manager: Michal Bílek

Michal Bílek announced his 24-man provisional squad on 14 May 2012. On 28 May 2012, he replaced Daniel Pudil with Vladimír Darida. The following day, he confirmed his 23-man squad, removing Tomáš Grigar.

Group B

Netherlands
Manager: Bert van Marwijk

On 7 May 2012, Bert van Marwijk named a provisional list of 36 players for the tournament. However, Erik Pieters was forced to pull out of the squad shortly after the announcement with a foot injury. On 15 May 2012, Van Marwijk reduced his squad to 27 players. On 26 May 2012, Van Marwijk announced his 23-man squad for the tournament.

Denmark
Manager: Morten Olsen

Denmark coach Morten Olsen named a 20-man squad for the tournament on 16 May 2012, with the three remaining berths to be filled. Anders Lindegaard was selected on 19 May. Jores Okore and Nicklas Pedersen were selected on 24 May. On 29 May, Thomas Sørensen was replaced by Kasper Schmeichel due to a back injury.

Germany
Manager: Joachim Löw

On 7 May 2012, Löw named a provisional list of 27 players for the tournament. On 28 May 2012, Löw announced his 23-man squad.

Portugal
Manager: Paulo Bento

Paulo Bento named his final 23-man squad on 14 May 2012. On 23 May, Hugo Viana replaced Carlos Martins after Martins suffered a calf injury.

Group C

Spain
Manager: Vicente del Bosque

Vicente del Bosque named a squad to play in a set of warm-up matches on 15 May 2012, but it did not include any Barcelona, Athletic Bilbao or Chelsea players as the two Spanish sides were preparing for the Copa del Rey Final final on 25 May, while Chelsea were to take on Bayern Munich in the UEFA Champions League Final on 19 May. On 21 May 2012, Del Bosque called-up Chelsea players Fernando Torres and Juan Mata for the friendly matches. On 27 May, Del Bosque gave the final squad list, complete with Barcelona and Athletic Bilbao players.

Italy
Manager: Cesare Prandelli

Cesare Prandelli named a provisional 32-man squad on 13 May 2012, the final day of the 2011–12 Serie A season. On 29 May 2012, Prandelli announced his final squad list, with defender Domenico Criscito not considered due to match-fixing charges.

Republic of Ireland
Manager:  Giovanni Trapattoni

On 7 May 2012, Giovanni Trapattoni announced his 23-man squad list for Euro 2012, along with a five-man stand-by list. Keith Fahey withdrew with a groin injury on 26 May and was replaced by Paul Green. On 29 May 2012 Kevin Foley was replaced by Paul McShane. The Ireland team was the only squad at the tournament to consist entirely of players from foreign leagues.

Croatia
Manager: Slaven Bilić

On 10 May 2012, a provisional list of 27 players was announced. On 29 May, the final 23-man squad was announced. On 4 June 2012, Ivica Olić was ruled out with an injury and was replaced by Nikola Kalinić. On 7 June 2012, Ivo Iličević was ruled out with an injury and was replaced by Šime Vrsaljko.

Group D

Ukraine
Manager: Oleh Blokhin

On 8 May 2012 Blokhin named a provisional list of 26 players for the tournament.
On 29 May 2012 Blokhin announced the final squad for the tournament.

Sweden
Manager: Erik Hamrén

Erik Hamrén announced Sweden's 23-man squad on 14 May 2012.

England
Manager: Roy Hodgson

Roy Hodgson announced England's 23-man squad on 16 May 2012, along with a five-man stand-by list. The England team is the only squad to consist entirely of players from their domestic league. On 25 May, John Ruddy was ruled out with a broken finger; Jack Butland was called up as his replacement. On 28 May, Gareth Barry was ruled out with a groin injury, being replaced by Phil Jagielka. On 31 May, Frank Lampard was ruled out with a thigh injury and was replaced by Jordan Henderson. On 3 June, Gary Cahill was ruled out with a double fracture of his jaw and Martin Kelly was called up as his replacement.

France
Manager: Laurent Blanc

Blanc named his first shortlist on 9 May 2012, consisting of 12 players playing abroad. On 15 May 2012 second shortlist of 15 France-based players was announced, while on the same day Tottenham defender Younès Kaboul was ruled out of the tournament with a knee injury, leaving Blanc with a 26-man squad. On 29 May 2012, Blanc announced his final 23-man squad.

Statistics
Republic of Ireland's Robbie Keane (LA Galaxy) and Sweden's Christian Wilhelmsson (Al Hilal) were the only two players at the tournament not playing in a UEFA league. 
The youngest player at the tournament was Jetro Willems of the Netherlands, born on 30 March 1994.
The oldest player at the tournament was Greece goalkeeper Kostas Chalkias, born on 30 May 1974.
The oldest outfield player at the tournament was Greece striker Nikos Liberopoulos, born on 4 August 1975.
The youngest squad at the tournament was Germany, with an average age of 24.5 years.
The oldest squad at the tournament was Russia, with an average age of 28.3 years.
The tournament featured twelve players with more than 100 international caps for their country:
129 caps – Iker Casillas (Spain)
125 caps – Anders Svensson (Sweden)
122 caps – Shay Given (Republic of Ireland)
120 caps – Giorgos Karagounis (Greece)
115 caps – Robbie Keane (Republic of Ireland)
114 caps – Miroslav Klose (Germany)
114 caps – Olof Mellberg (Sweden)
114 caps – Dennis Rommedahl (Denmark)
114 caps – Anatoliy Tymoshchuk (Ukraine)
113 caps – Gianluigi Buffon (Italy)
108 caps – Xavi (Spain)
105 caps – Andriy Shevchenko (Ukraine)
The squads included five players who still had not made their debut at full international level prior to the start of the tournament. Of the five, only Giaccherini made his debut in the tournament. The five players were:
Jack Butland (England)
Emanuele Giaccherini (Italy)
Vladimir Granat (Russia)
Ivan Kelava (Croatia)
Kasper Schmeichel (Denmark)

Player representation

By club

By club nationality
Nations in bold were represented by their national teams in the tournament

Notes

References

External links
Euro 2012 official site

2012
Squads